Szulborze Wielkie  is a village in Ostrów Mazowiecka County, Masovian Voivodeship, in east-central Poland. It is the seat of the gmina (administrative district) called Gmina Szulborze Wielkie.

References 

Szulborze Wielkie
Łomża Governorate
Białystok Voivodeship (1919–1939)
Warsaw Voivodeship (1919–1939)
Belastok Region
Holocaust locations in Poland